The 2011 BWF Grand Prix Gold and Grand Prix was the fifth season of BWF Grand Prix Gold and Grand Prix.

Schedule
Below is the schedule released by Badminton World Federation:

Results

Winners

Performance by countries
Tabulated below are the Grand Prix performances based on countries. Only countries who have won a title are listed:

Grand Prix Gold
German Open
RWE-Sporthalle, Mülheim, Germany, March 1–6, 2011.

Swiss Open
St. Jakobshalle, Basel, Switzerland, March 15–20, 2011.

Australian Open
Melbourne Sports and Aquatic Centre, Melbourne, Australia, April 5–10, 2011.

Malaysia Open
Sultan Abdul Halim Stadium, Alor Setar, Malaysia, May 3–8, 2011.

Thailand Open
CU Sport Complex, Bangkok, Thailand, June 7–12, 2011.

U.S. Open
Orange County Badminton Club, Orange, California, United States, July 11–16, 2011.

Chinese Taipei Open
Taipei County Shinjuang Stadium, Taipei, Republic of China, September 6–11, 2011.

Indonesia Open
Gor Bulutangkis Palaran Samarinda, Samarinda, Indonesia, September 27–October 2, 2011.

Bitburger Open
Saarlandhalle, Saarbrücken, Germany, November 1–6, 2011.

Macau Open
Cotai Arena, The Venetian, Macau, November 29–December 4, 2011.

Korea Open
Hwasun Indoor Stadium, Hwasun, South Korea, December 6–11, 2011.

India Open
Babu Banarasi Das Indoor Stadium, Lucknow, India, December 20–25, 2011.

Grand Prix
Russian Open
Sports Hall Olympic, Vladivostok, Russia, June 28–July 3, 2011.

Canada Open
Richmond Oval, Richmond, Vancouver, British Columbia, Canada, July 19–24, 2011.

Vietnam Open
Phan Dinh Phung Stadium, Ho Chi Minh City, Vietnam, August 22–28, 2011.

Dutch Open
Topsportcentrum Almere, Almere, Netherlands, October 11–16, 2011.

References

BWF Grand Prix Gold and Grand Prix
Bwf Grand Prix Gold and Grand Prix